Same language subtitling (SLS) refers to the practice of subtitling programs on TV in the same language as the audio. Initially introduced in the early 1970s as a means to make services available to the hard of hearing, closed captioning as it became known was standardized for Latin alphabets in the 1976 World System Teletext agreement. Non-Latin character set services have subsequently been introduced, and are used in India, and in China to also aid literacy.

In the mid-1980s Pioneer introduced a range of Laserdisc based Karaoke machines, with subtitled Music video playback combined with a Karaoke PA system, the  concept was subsequently adapted for the 1986 multi-format Disney Sing-Along Songs series, and later transferred to the PlayStation 2, and subsequent games consoles, and has in parallel been adapted to classroom use of synchronized captioning of musical lyrics (or any text with an Audio and/or Video source) as a Repeated Reading activity.

The 1996 DVD-Video standard was published with support for up to 32 separate synchronised subtitling streams to be packaged with a video file.

Literacy promotion 
This idea was struck upon by Brij Kothari, who believed that SLS makes reading practice an incidental, automatic, and subconscious part of popular TV entertainment, at a low per-person cost to shore up literacy rates in India.

Brij Kothari was watching a Spanish film on video with English subtitles during a break from dissertation writing in 1996 when the thought hit him that if all Hindi film songs were subtitled in Hindi, on television in India, it would bring about a revolution in literacy. Upon completion of his academic pursuits Kothari returned to India. In late 1996 he joined the faculty of the Indian Institute of Management in Ahmedabad. While continuing to teach communication to MBA students, he started work on SLS and it became a project of IIM. The idea of SLS was first innovated, researched, pioneered and nationalized by the Centre for Educational Innovation, Indian Institute of Management, Ahmedabad under Kothari. The program took off on a national scale by August 2002.

Before Kothari's study, most available research on captioning had demonstrated limited results. As a direct result of Kothari's success with subtitled music video there are several new related studies using technology and music video that are also showing remarkable results.

Implementation 
During the last 10 years in India, SLS has been implemented on Doordarshan's film song programmes in Hindi, Bengali, Gujarati, Marathi, Telugu, Tamil, Kannada, Malayalam, Odia, and Punjabi. For each language the subtitles are in the same language as the audio.

A 2002–2007 Nielsen-ORG study demonstrated that the ability to read a paragraph among schoolchildren jumped from 25% to 56% when exposed to 30 minutes a week of the Rangoli program with subtitles. Over 90% said they prefer having subtitles on songs owing to their interest in the lyrics.

The basic SLS reading activity involves students viewing a short subtitled presentation projected on-screen, while completing a response worksheet. Ideally, the subtitling should have high quality synchronization of audio and text, text should change colors in syllabic synchronization to audio model, and the source media should be dynamic and engaging.

Outside India 

Chinese-language programmes are often subtitled, because speakers of other varieties of Chinese can read Standard Written Chinese, even if they cannot understand the spoken dialect.

See also 
 Closed captioning
 ColorSounds
 Subtitling
 Surtitles
 Karaoke

References

Further reading 
 Kothari, Brij; Takeda, Joe; Joshi, Ashok; Pandey, Avinash (2003). "Chapter 13: Same Language Subtitling: A Butterfly for Literacy?". Reading Beyond the Alphabet. SAGE Publishing. pp. 213–229. .

Subtitling
Assistive technology
Translation
Teletext
Literacy
Learning to read